Universal Amphitheatre (later known as Gibson Amphitheatre) was an indoor amphitheatre located in Los Angeles, California within  Universal City. It was built as an outdoor venue, opening in the summer of 1972 with a production of Jesus Christ Superstar.  It was remodeled and converted into an indoor theatre in 1982 to improve acoustics. The amphitheater closed on September 6, 2013 and was demolished for The Wizarding World of Harry Potter attraction at Universal Studios Hollywood.

Early history
The Amphitheatre was built as a daytime arena where patrons of the Universal Studios Studio Tour could watch stuntmen perform a western-themed stunt show and shootout.  Construction began in 1969.  By 1970, the stage was completed and three old west facades were constructed for the show.  The arena was completed in 1971.

Because it was empty at night, a young studio tour guide suggested that the arena be used to hold rock concerts.  On June 28, 1972, the venue hosted its first concert, a production of the Broadway rock musical Jesus Christ Superstar.  The show was a hit and was extended until cold weather forced its closure.

During its early years, the stunt show was performed during the day while at night the venue hosted concerts. The theatre proved to be so popular that it regularly filled to 98% capacity.  After one year, the studio expanded it to seat 5,200 patrons.

The venue was the site of various live albums recordings beginning with Joni Mitchell's Miles of Aisles from August 14 to 17, 1974 and John Denver's An Evening With John Denver from August 26 to September 1, 1974.

In 1980, the venue closed for two years for a major renovation. A roof was constructed to enable year-round entertainment. Acoustics were improved and seating was expanded again to 6,251 seats.

On September 15, 1987 singer Tony Melendez sang Never Be The Same while playing the guitar with his feet in a special performance for Pope John Paul II as part of the pope's two day visit to Los Angeles.

The Universal Amphitheatre hosted the Late Night with David Letterman 8th Anniversary Special in 1990.

From 1991 to 2002, it served as the ceremony venue for the Academy of Country Music Awards.

In May 1993, Universal added the Universal CityWalk shopping and dining district around the entrance to the theatre, allowing patrons to seek refreshments before and after concerts.

On July 29 and 30, 1999, pop/R&B singer Whitney Houston gave her last two North American concerts at the theatre on her My Love Is Your Love World Tour. Houston would go on to have one more world tour in 2010, but did not tour North America again. 
During its forty-year history, the venue hosted concerts by high-profile touring artists such as Mariah Carey, Madonna, The Grateful Dead, Cher, Janet Jackson, Jenni Rivera, George Michael, Selena, Elton John, Toto, Bette Midler, Celine Dion, David Bowie, Sting, Billy Joel, Aerosmith, Crosby, Stills, and Nash, Neil Young, Donna Summer, No Doubt, Slipknot, System of A Down and Gloria Trevi. The venue also hosted musicals such as The Who's Tommy and major recurring events, including the MTV Movie Awards, the MTV Video Music Awards and the Teen Choice Awards.

Name change
The theatre was known as the Universal Amphitheatre from its inception until early 2005, when naming rights were acquired by the Gibson Guitar Corporation as part of a partnership between Gibson, Universal and House of Blues.

Closure
On December 6, 2011, it was announced that Universal Amphitheatre would close and would be demolished to make way for The Wizarding World of Harry Potter theme park area at Universal Studios Hollywood.

Although the venue had events scheduled until October 2013, it officially closed in September of that year.

The final performance held at the Gibson Amphitheatre was Pepe Aguilar on September 6, 2013.

At the time of its closure, it was the third largest mid-sized venue in California, behind the Nokia Theatre and the Shrine Auditorium - two other Los Angeles venues. The amphitheatre was demolished on September 25, 2013.

See also
List of contemporary amphitheatres

References

External links

Gibson Amphitheatre on Live Nation
Gibson Amphitheatre
Home movies showing the arena with the original Wild West stunt show in 1971

Amphitheaters in California
Music venues in Los Angeles
Universal City, California
Buildings and structures in the San Fernando Valley
Landmarks in Los Angeles
Theatres in Hollywood, Los Angeles
Music venues completed in 1972
Theatres completed in 1972
1972 establishments in California
2013 disestablishments in California
Demolished buildings and structures in Los Angeles
Buildings and structures demolished in 2013